Joaquín Bárbara y Balza (1867–1931) was a Spanish painter. He was born in Llodio, Álava, and died in Santander, Cantabria.

References

Bibliografia 

Bernaola Luxa, Egoitz (2017). «Joaquín Bárbara y Balza, pintor entre dos siglos. Paisajes, figuras, luces y sombras de un artista olvidado 1867-1931». Vitoria-Gasteiz: Cofradía de Sant Roque de Laudio/Llodio, Fundación Alday, Fundación Vital, Ayuntamiento de Laudio/Llodio y Diputación Foral de Álava. 
García Díez, José Antonio (1990). "La Pintura en Álava". Vitoria: Fundación Caja Vital Kutxa. .
Moreno Ruiz de Eguino & Pita Andrade, Iñaki; José Manuel (1995). «Basque artists in Rome (1865–1915)». Fundación Social y Cultural Kutxa. .

1867 births
1931 deaths
Basque painters
19th-century Spanish painters
19th-century Spanish male artists
Spanish male painters
20th-century Spanish painters
20th-century Spanish male artists
People from Bilbao
1931 suicides
Suicides by firearm in Spain